Taoa is a village in Wallis and Futuna. It is located in Alo District on the southern coast of Futuna Island. Its population according to the 2018 census was 480 people.

References

Populated places in Wallis and Futuna